The following radio stations broadcast on AM frequency 1611 kHz:

In Australia 
 Vision Christian Radio in Melbourne (western), Victoria.
 Old Gold 1611AM in Mildura, Victoria.
 Easy Listening 1611am in Wagin, Western Australia.

References

Lists of radio stations by frequency